Cedar Creek is a  south flowing stream which heads on the eastern flank of Burra Burra Peak in the Diablo Range, and is tributary to Pacheco Creek, in Santa Clara County, California.

History 
Cedar Creek is likely named for California juniper (Juniperus californica), a small tree similar to Eastern red cedar (Juniperus virginiana) that is native to California, southern Nevada, and western Arizona.

Watershed 
(Cañada de la Dormida is Spanish for "valley of the sleeping woman".) From there it continues south where it is joined on the right by an unnamed tributary in Hageman Canyon, and from there continues south into Hurricane Canyon, after which it ends at its confluence with Pacheco Creek.

Ecology 
Professor Jerry Smith of San Jose State University reported that although Cedar Creek is generally intermittent in summer, it was used by steelhead trout (Oncorhynchus mykiss) at least through the 1970's.

The Santa Clara Valley Habitat Agency has identified the Cedar Creek undercrossing below Pacheco Pass Highway (California State Route 152) as a wildlife linkage enabling smaller animals to safely cross beneath this high-speed road at the border of Santa Clara County and San Benito County.

See also 
 Pacheco Creek
 Diablo Range

References

See also 
 Santa Clara Valley Habitat Agency home page
 Pajaro River Watershed Council

Rivers of Santa Clara County, California
Rivers of San Benito County, California
Rivers of Northern California